The , frequently abbreviated to Aikokutō (愛国党, Aikokutō), is a Japanese political party and far-right political group. It was created in 1951 by right-wing ultranationalist Bin Akao, who became the first head of the party.

Otoya Yamaguchi, who assassinated Inejirō Asanuma of the Japanese Socialist Party in 1960, was a member of the Aikokutō, as was Kazutaka Komori, who perpetrated the Shimanaka incident in 1961.

Party leader Akao Bin was arrested for conspiracy to murder in the wake of the Shimanaka incident, but was not indicted due to lack of evidence, and instead was sentenced to eight months in prison for the lesser charges of disturbing the peace and intimidation.

See also

Politics of Japan
List of political parties in Japan
History of Japan

References

Citations

Works cited

External links

1951 establishments in Japan
Anti-communist organizations in Japan
Anti-communist parties
Far-right politics in Japan
Conservative parties in Japan
Nationalist parties in Japan
Political parties established in 1951
Political parties in Japan
Far-right political parties